Thoroughbred is a series of young-adult novels that revolves around Kentucky Thoroughbred racing and equestrianism. The series was started in 1991 by Joanna Campbell (better known as Jo Ann Simon, previously Haessig), and numbered 72 books, in addition to several "super editions" and a spin-off series, Ashleigh, by the time it ended in 2005. The series focuses on a group of core characters, primarily Ashleigh Griffen, Samantha McLean, Cindy Blake/McLean and Ashleigh's daughter Christina, as well as Christina's friends. The series originally followed the adventures of Ashleigh as she was growing up; when Ashleigh reached adulthood, the focus of the books shifted to young Samantha McLean. During Samantha's college and adult years, the books centered on Cindy Blake McLean, Samantha's adopted younger sister. Late in the series, there was a large "time gap" before the series focused on to a teenaged Christina and her cousin Melanie.

The books, which are intended for a primarily pre-teen, female audience, explore the characters' adventures in horse racing, eventing, and steeplechase. Christina and Melanie, the two main characters, are both jockeys, and many of the books deal with their challenges on and off the track: while their life with their horses comprises the main storyline, school, boyfriends, and family life often provide subplots. The Reese family farm, Whitebrook, is the setting for most of the series.

Thoroughbred is published by HarperEntertainment, an imprint of HarperCollins. A total of twelve different authors have contributed to the series over the fifteen years of its existence. By book 15, there were two million Thoroughbred books in print.

Structure of the books 
The Thoroughbred series is written in the third-person narrative and is typically told from a single person's viewpoint. For the first twenty-three books, the series is told from the viewpoints of Ashleigh Griffen (#1 - #5), Samantha McLean (#6 - #12), and Cindy McLean (#13 - #23). After book twenty-three, the series started what was called the "New Generation" and skipped ten years to a new group of characters: Christina Reese, Melanie Graham, Parker Townsend, and a small group of minor characters. These books were still written in the third-person, but the viewpoints of characters would alternate between books.

Series overview

Books 1–23: Original series 

Early on, the series primarily focuses on Ashleigh Griffen and her adventures at Townsend Acres, a racing and breeding farm owned by Clay Townsend.  Ashleigh's parents, Derek and Elaine Griffen, take over at the breeding area of Townsend Acres after their own farm, Edgardale, has to be sold because of a virus that spread around the farm and killed both mares and foals.  Ashleigh dislikes her new life at first, but becomes more accustomed to it after an older mare named Townsend Holly gives birth to a small filly whom she names Wonder.  Though Wonder is very weak and nearly dies multiple  times,  through Ashleigh's care, the filly grows up to be a Kentucky Derby and Belmont-winning racehorse.  After Ashleigh grows up, the plot is focused on Samantha McLean afterward.

The New Generation 
After book 23, Cindy's Honor, the series skipped forward ten years and began anew with a focus on eventing. The new series involved Ashleigh Griffen's daughter, Christina, who traded Wonder's latest foal, Wonder's Legacy, for a racehorse, named Sterling Dream, which she turned into an eventer. After 12 books, the series quickly shifted from eventing back to racing due to popular demand from fans.

After Ashleigh's Wonder's death, Christina became attached to Wonder's last foal, Wonder's Star. From this point, the series retained a predominantly Thoroughbred-racing focus, leaving eventing to Parker Townsend, who became a regular part of the series soon after Wonder's death. The series then became focused on Christina and Melanie and their horses Wonder's Star, Perfect Image, and Hi Jinx.

The last main character 
Allie Avery, the final main character of Thoroughbred, was introduced at the very end of the series as the daughter of Craig and Jilly Avery; Craig and Jilly had been removed from the series early on, but were brought back to make the introduction of a new character possible. Allie was both interested in eventing and racing, bringing together the two disciplines in the Thoroughbred series, although she ultimately decided upon becoming a jockey. She is given Wonder's Legacy, the often-forgotten son of Ashleigh's Wonder, as a gift when she is fourteen.

By late 2005, the Thoroughbred series was officially ended. The last book of the series was Legacy's Gift, a book centered on Allie and Wonder's Legacy, as well as the birth of Legacy's daughter, Allie's Wonder. The end of the series was much-protested, despite the seeming decline in quality of plots and writing.

List of major characters
Ashleigh Griffen Reese, the middle child of Derek and Elaine Griffen and the sister of Caroline and Rory Griffen.  Ashleigh is the jockey of Wonder in the Breeders' Cup Classic, a trainer at, and eventually the owner of, Whitebrook Farm. She marries Mike Reese in Thoroughbred No. 9, Pride's Challenge, and has a daughter, Christina. Ashleigh has been in all of the books.
Caroline Griffen, the older sister of Ashleigh and Rory Griffen and the oldest child of Derek and Elaine Griffen. Caroline has been afraid of horses ever since one almost ran away with her prior to the family moving to Townsend Acres. Caroline is interested in fashion, make up, music, and boys. 
Rory Griffen, the younger brother of Caroline and Ashleigh and the youngest child of Derek and Elaine Griffen. Rory is horse crazy just like Ashleigh and their parents. Because he's only seven Rory is too young to understand why his family moved to Townsend Acres. Rory eventually gets a new pony named Moe 2.
Derek Griffen, the father of Caroline, Ashleigh, and Rory Griffen and the husband of Elaine Griffen. Derek is a breeding manager at Townsend Acres. Derek warns Ashleigh not to get too close to Wonder out of fear that she'll die. Derek wants Ashleigh to work on math since it is her worst subject. Derek is concerned about Ashleigh when her grades slip. 
Elaine Griffen, the mother of Caroline, Ashleigh, and Rory Griffen and the wife of Derek Griffen. Elaine is a breeding manager at Townsend Acres. Elaine firmly believes that school comes before horses. When Ashleigh's grades slip due to spending too much time with Wonder Elaine and Derek ground Ashleigh until her grades improve. Elaine wants Ashleigh to stay away from Wonder out of fear that she'll get hurt. 
Clay Townsend, the owner of Townsend Acres and the grandfather of Parker Townsend. He was much more kind to Ashleigh and the other characters than his son or daughter-in-law, although he turned a blind eye when it came to his son. Clay's wife is never mentioned in the books.
Charles "Charlie" Burke, a crusty old trainer with a soft spot for young people, who helped Ashleigh nurse Wonder back to health, train, and race her. He was also instrumental in getting Ashleigh's jockey career started. After Ashleigh's grounded when her grades slip Charlie agrees with her punishment. Charlie explains that Ashleigh's parents are only doing what they think is best. He died in Pride's Challenge, from a heart attack on Ashleigh and Mike's wedding day.
Samantha McLean Nelson, The biological child of Ian and Suzanne McLean and the step daughter of Beth McLean. The half sister of Kevin McLean and the adoptive half sister of Cindy. Ashleigh's close friend, the jockey of Sierra. She marries Tor Nelson. Later in the series, she is pregnant with twins and runs an eventing school, Whisperwood, which is attended by Christina and Parker. Prior to the "Thoroughbred" series Samantha's mother was killed in a riding accident. Ian forced Samantha to stop riding after Suzanne died and only allowed her to groom horses. Ian does this to keep Samantha safe. Ian reluctantly gives Samantha permission to ride again on the condition that she's careful. 
Brad and Lavinia Townsend, the aristocratic owners of Townsend Acres, where Ashleigh once lived. They are the parents of Parker/Ross (as their son's name changes during the series for unknown reasons).
Cindy Blake McLean al-Rihani, Samantha and Kevin's adopted sister. She was a jockey until she tore her rotator cuff in an accident. Cindy eventually marries Ben al-Rihani and they adopt their daughter Allie after her parents die. Cindy's biological parents died in a car accident prior to the events of the series. Cindy remains in foster care until Ian and Beth adopt her.
Ian McLean, Head trainer and breeding manager at Whitebrook Farm. Samantha and Kevin's overprotective father and Cindy's adoptive father, remarried to Beth Raines, Cindy's adoptive mother. His first wife Suzanne was killed in a riding accident prior to the books. Ian refused to let Samantha ride again in an effort to keep her safe. Ian eventually realized that Suzanne wouldn't want Samantha to stop riding. Ian tells Samantha that she can ride again, but she has to be careful. 
Elizabeth "Beth" Raines McLean, Samantha's step mother, Kevin's mother, and Cindy's adoptive mother. She is a part owner of an aerobics company and is strict on meal times, eating healthily and bedtimes. She is married to Ian McLean, Cindy's adoptive father.
Kevin McLean, Ian and Beth McLean's son. He is the half brother of Samantha McLean and the adoptive half brother of Cindy McLean. He dated Melanie Graham for a while.
Amanda "Mandy" Jarvis, Bold little girl who has leg braces. Owns a pony called Butterball and hopes to jump in the Olympics.
Christina Reese, Ashleigh and Mike's daughter, Caroline and Rory's niece, and Derek and Elaine's granddaughter. Christina is the jockey of Wonder's Star. Her boyfriend is Parker Townsend.
Melanie Graham, Christina's cousin, also a jockey.
Parker Townsend, Christina's boyfriend, the son of Brad and Lavinia, and the grandson of Clay Townsend. He competes in three-day-eventing.
Allison "Allie" Avery al-Rihani, the daughter of Jilly Gordon and Craig Avery. Cindy and Ben adopt Allie after her parents die.
Jilly Gordon Avery, the mother of Allie Avery and wife of Craig Avery. She was the jockey of Ashleigh's Wonder. After marrying Craig Jilly moves to California and gives birth to their daughter Allie. Jilly eventually dies from Leukemia. 
Craig Avery, the father of Allie Avery and husband of Craig Avery. Craig dies in a racing accident two years after Jilly died from Leukemia.
Michael "Mike" Reese, Ashleigh's husband, Christina's father, Caroline and Rory's brother-in-law, and Derek and Elaine's son-in-law. Mike starts out as Ashleigh's boyfriend. They are later married in Pride's Challenge. Mike and Ashleigh eventually welcome their daughter Christina.
Suzanne McLean, Ian's late wife and Samantha's biological mother. Suzanne's story is mentioned in Samantha's Journey. Before she died Samantha's family lived in Miami, Florida. When Samantha was 12 years old Suzanne was killed in a riding accident. After her death Ian and Samantha left Miami and moved to Kentucky. Ian refused to allow Samantha to ride again and only allowed her to groom horses. Ian believed this was the only way to keep his daughter safe. Ian eventually realized that Suzanne wouldn't have wanted Samantha to stop riding. Ian reluctantly agreed to let Samantha ride again as long as she's careful.
Tor Nelson, Samantha's husband, Ian and Beth's son-in-law, and Cindy and Kevin's brother-in-law.

List of major horse characters
Ashleigh's Wonder, the sickly foal who Ashleigh nurses to health and trains to become a champion winning the Kentucky Derby and the Belmont Stakes as well as the Breeders' Cup Classic. Clay Townsend then gives Ashleigh a half-interest in Wonder and all her foals, which then sets up a majority of plots in the early series as conflicts occur around the management and training of her offspring. She is the daughter of Townsend Holly and Townsend Pride, half-sister to Shining (through her sire) and the dam of six foals throughout the series Wonder's Pride, Townsend Princess, Mr. Wonderful, Wonder's Champion, Wonder's Legacy and Wonder's Star. She dies after complications of the birth of her last foal.
Townsend Prince, Wonder's half-brother and racing rival, he dies in an accident early in the series once Wonder has her first foals.
Fleet Goddess, a filly by Battlecry. Fleet Goddess was the first horse that Ashleigh purchased and trained after Wonder had retired from racing. Fleet Goddess had a successful career, but also became well known as a successful broodmare, with her off-spring being featured as minor characters throughout the series, Fleeting Moment, Precocious, Limitless Time, and Fleet Street.
Wonder's Pride, Wonder's first colt, a very successful racehorse winning the Kentucky Derby, the Preakness and the Breeder's Cup Classic. He retired from racing due to complications from a twisted intestine that nearly killed him in Book #10 Pride's Last Race.
Townsend Princess, Wonder's first and only filly featured in the series, had a rough start. Injured early in her training by Lavinia Townsend, Princess was forced to spend months healing from a fractured cannon bone. She would later repeat the injury in the Blue Grass Stakes race and have to retire from racing at an early age. Princess is the dam of Wonder's first granddaughter Honor Bright (by Union Honour) who would feature as the main horse in Book #23.
Mr. Wonderful, Wonder's second colt, often described as honey coloured, was not featured as a major character throughout the stories (Shining and Glory had arisen as more of the stars of Whitebrook). He injured a tendon in his two-year-old season. He won the Champagne Stakes in #18 Glory's Rival. He also won several big races as a four-year-old. He retired from racing due to a mysterious virus when he was four and was put up to stud alongside his older brother.
Shining Wonder's half-sister purchased at an auction by Mike Reese in Book #11, was given to Samantha McLean as a gift due to her involvement nursing the abused and neglected filly back to health. Shining became the star racer of Whitebrook Farm winning several stakes races including the Breeder's Cup Distaff (#18 Glory's Rival). Shining was the dam of Lucky Chance a filly the same age as Wonder's granddaughter, Honor Bright
Wonder's Champion, Wonder's arguably most successful foal (by Townsend Victor), won the Triple Crown of Thoroughbred Racing and the Dubai World Cup (Books 21 and 22) after a rough start in Book 20. He was characterized as mischievous and would often misbehave and get himself into trouble, which nearly cost him his racing career.
Sierra, a liver chestnut stallion who Samantha McLean and her boyfriend Tor Nelson trained to be a successful steeplechaser after his flop as a flat racer.
Lord Ainsley, a colt purchased by Brad Townsend, Pride's main racing rival
Her Majesty, a filly owned by Lavinia Townsend, would appear as a rival to Samantha Nelson (McLean)'s filly Shining
March to Glory, a stolen horse, rescued by Cindy McLean, who would later become the star of the Whitebrook racing line for books 14-18. A half-interest in Glory was given to the Townsends in order to keep Champion training at Whitebrook (Book 18 Glory's Rival.) Glory was the subject of a scandal as a fellow trainer and veterinarian tried to drug and kill him in #16 Glory in Danger. Glory won the Breeder's Cup Classic by 30 lengths setting a new world record in Glory's Rival (#18).
Storm's Ransom, a grey sprinter, purchased at the Saratoga Yearling Sale in Book #17 Ashleigh's Farewell. He was the subject of Book 19 as he contracted a fatal illness and died. Cindy was responsible for his early training and would continue to visit his grave throughout the series.
Wonder's Legacy, a forgotten colt who was Wonder's 5th foal, given to Christina Reese (#24) who would later trade her half-interest in Wonder's Legacy for Sterling Dream a Thoroughbred she would later train to become a successful eventer. Legacy was given to Allie Avery in the last books.
Sterling Dream, owned by Christina Reese, became an eventing horse after coming off the track and being abused by a groom. In Legacy's Gift (#72) Sterling was the dam of Allie's Wonder
Wonder's Star Wonder's last colt who won the last leg of the Triple Crown, the Belmont Stakes. He runs his best for Christina Reese.

Authors
Joanna Campbell created the first fourteen Thoroughbred books, as well as the first two books in the spin-off series, Ashleigh. After Campbell stopped writing, long-time editor Karen Bentley took over, writing books fifteen through twenty-three. After Karen Bentley left the series, there was a rotating "panel" of contributing authors: Allison Estes, Alice Leonhardt, Dale Blackwell Gasque, Lois Symanski, Mary Newhall Anderson, Karle Dickerson, and Jennifer Chu. Thoroughbred #36, Without Wonder, was written under the pen name "Brooke James" by an unknown author.

Reception 
The series was met with mixed reviews. One review noted that while the Thoroughbred books were reliant on the cliché of a bond between a girl and a horse, they were "better written and more knowledgeable" on racing. Charlene Strickland, in a review of Wonder's Promise, wrote that while the book itself was enjoyable, it "frequently lapses into sentimentality".

Later books in the series were less well-received, with critics noting a significant decrease in quality once Campbell retired from the Thoroughbred novels.

See also 
The Saddle Club
Pony Pals

References 

American children's novels
Fictional horses
Novel series
Series of children's books
Horse racing novels
Pony books
HarperCollins books
1990s children's books